The Bananas was a Canadian children's television series which aired on CBC Television in 1969.

Premise
The Bananas (Bonnie-Carol Case, John Davies, Melody Greer, Francois-Regis Klanfer) were joined in Bananaland by The Blob (a special-effects pet), the Official, Certified, Genuine, Grade-A Gorilla and The Big Mouth (which provided factoids when fed). Alan Maitland was the Great Announcer.

The show's intent was to promote "attitudes through humour" using comedic sketches. The CBC's schools and youth department produced the series for a target audience between ages nine and 14.

Scheduling
This half-hour series was broadcast on Thursdays at 4:30 p.m. (Eastern time) from 2 January to 6 February 1969.

References

External links
 
 

CBC Television original programming
1969 Canadian television series debuts
1969 Canadian television series endings
1960s Canadian children's television series